Leptidosophia is a genus of parasitic flies in the family Tachinidae.

Species
Leptidosophia flava Aldrich, 1929
Leptidosophia lutescens Townsend, 1931

References

Diptera of South America
Dexiinae
Tachinidae genera
Taxa named by Charles Henry Tyler Townsend